Hugo Gabriel Bascuñán Vera (born 10 January 1985) is a Chilean footballer who currently plays for Chilean Segunda División side San Antonio Unido.

References

External links
 
 
 Hugo Bascuñán at playmakerstats.com (English version of ceroacero.es)

1985 births
Living people
People from Casablanca, Chile
People from Valparaíso Province
People from Valparaíso Region
Chilean footballers
Chile youth international footballers
Chile under-20 international footballers
Chilean expatriate footballers
Everton de Viña del Mar footballers
Miramar Misiones players
Universidad de Concepción footballers
Santiago Wanderers footballers
Unión La Calera footballers
Unión Temuco footballers
San Marcos de Arica footballers
Ñublense footballers
Santiago Morning footballers
San Antonio Unido footballers
Chilean Primera División players
Primera B de Chile players
Segunda División Profesional de Chile players
Uruguayan Primera División players
Venezuelan Segunda División players
Chilean expatriate sportspeople in Uruguay
Expatriate footballers in Uruguay
Chilean expatriate sportspeople in Venezuela
Expatriate footballers in Venezuela
Association football defenders